Bronislau "Bronko" Nagurski (November 3, 1908 – January 7, 1990) was a Canadian-born professional American football player in the National Football League (NFL), renowned for his strength and size. Nagurski was also a successful professional wrestler, recognized as a multiple-time World Heavyweight Champion.

Nagurski became a standout playing both tackle on defense and fullback on offense at the University of Minnesota from 1927 to 1929, selected a consensus All-American in 1929 and inducted into the College Football Hall of Fame in its inaugural year of 1951. His professional career with the Chicago Bears, which began in 1930 and ended on two occasions in 1937 and 1943, also made him an inaugural inductee into the Pro Football Hall of Fame in 1963.

Youth and collegiate career
Nagurski was born in Rainy River, Ontario, Canada, in a family of Ukrainian and Polish descent. His family moved to International Falls, Minnesota, when he was five years old. His parents, "Mike" and Michelina Nagurski, were immigrants from Galicia. Nagurski grew up working on his parents' farm and sawmill, delivering groceries for his father's grocery store and in his teens laboring at nearby timbering operations, growing into a powerfully muscular six-footer.

Nagurski was discovered and signed by University of Minnesota head coach Clarence Spears, who drove to International Falls to meet another player. On the outside of town, he watched Nagurski out plowing a field without assistance. According to legend, Spears asked directions and Bronko lifted his plow and used it to point. He was signed on the spot to play for the Golden Gophers. Spears admitted he concocted the story on his long drive back to the university in Minneapolis.

Legends aside, on his first day of practice Spears decided to test Nagurski in the "Nutcracker" drill, where a defensive player had to take on two blockers and try to tackle a following ball carrier. On the first drill, two All-Big Ten linemen and Herb Joesting charged at Bronko, who promptly split the blockers and drove the big fullback into a blocking dummy. Spears sent in three more players, blew his whistle and watched Bronko produce the same explosive results and after a third try with the same conclusion realized what a super player he had recruited.

Nagurski became a standout playing both tackle on defense and fullback on offense at Minnesota from 1927 to 1929. In 1929, after posting 737 rushing yards, he was a consensus All-American at fullback, and despite playing fewer games at the position also made some All-American teams at tackle. The pre-eminent sportswriter of the day, Grantland Rice, listed him at the two positions in picking his 1929 All-America team. Rice later wrote, "Who would you pick to win a football game: 11 Jim Thorpes, 11 Glen Davises, 11 Red Granges, or 11 Bronko Nagurskis? The 11 Nagurskis would be a mop-up. It would be something close to murder and massacre.

His greatest collegiate game was against Wisconsin in the season finale in 1928. Wearing a corset to protect cracked vertebrae, he recovered a Badger fumble deep in their territory, then ran the ball six straight times to score the go-ahead touchdown. Later in the same game, he intercepted a pass to seal the victory.

During his three varsity seasons at Minnesota, the Gophers went  and won the Big Ten Conference championship in 1927. Nagurski was inducted into the College Football Hall of Fame in 1951.

While at the University of Minnesota, Nagurski was a member of Sigma Chi fraternity, at the same time as another All-American, Herb Joesting.

Professional career

Football
Nagurski turned professional to play for the Chicago Bears from 1930 to 1937. He ended his eight-year stint with 3,947 rushing yards on 856 attempts, completed 36 of 80 passes, and scored a total of 236 points.

He was probably the largest running back of his time, bigger than most linemen of the day, often dragging multiple tacklers with him. In a time when players were expected to play on both sides of the ball, he was a standout defensive lineman as well playing a ranging tackle or "The Monster." After an injury, instead of sitting on the bench, he would sometimes be put in as an offensive tackle. In a 1984 interview with Sports Illustrated writer Paul "Dr. Z" Zimmerman, when asked what position he would play if he were coming up in the present day, he said, "I would probably be a linebacker today. I wouldn't be carrying the ball 30 or 35 times a game."

A time-honored and perhaps apocryphal story about Nagurski is a scoring gallop that he made against the Washington Redskins, knocking two linebackers in opposite directions, stomping a defensive back and crushing a safety, then bouncing off the goalposts and cracking Wrigley Field's brick wall. On returning to the huddle for the extra point try, he reportedly said: "That last guy hit me awfully hard."

Once in a game against the Packers, the Bears prepared to punt, and Green Bay's Cal Hubbard went to Red Grange and said: "I promise not to try to block the kick, Red, but get out of the way so I can get a shot at that Polack." Grange, glad not to try to block Hubbard for once, obliged. Cal tore through the line, slammed into Nagurski and bounced off. Rising slowly, he turned to Grange and said: "Hey, Red, don't do me any more favors."

At the end of the 1932 season, the Chicago Bears and the Portsmouth Spartans were tied with the best regular-season records. To determine the champion, the league voted to hold its first playoff game. Because of cold weather, the game was held indoors at Chicago Stadium, which forced some temporary rule changes. Chicago won, 9–0. In the fourth quarter of the 1932 game, the Bears scored on a controversial touchdown: Carl Brumbaugh handed the ball off to fullback Nagurski, who pulled up and threw to Red Grange in the end zone for the score. The Spartans argued that Nagurski did not drop back five yards before passing to Grange, but the touchdown stood. The playoff proved so popular that the league reorganized into two divisions for the 1933 season, with the winners advancing to a scheduled championship game. A number of new rule changes were also instituted: the goal posts were moved forward to the goal line, every play started from between the hash marks, and forward passes could originate from anywhere behind the line of scrimmage (instead of the previous five yards behind).

In 1943, with the Bears losing so many players to World War II, Nagurski came out of retirement to play tackle. He remained at the position until he returned to fullback against the Chicago Cardinals, whom the Bears needed to defeat to advance to the 1943 NFL Championship Game; Nagurski scored a touchdown in the game as the Bears won 35–24. Chicago went on to win the 1943 title after beating the Washington Redskins 41–21, while Nagurski scored on a three-yard touchdown run in the second quarter.

He retired again after the 1943 season and became the backfield coach for the UCLA Bruins. After one year, he resigned from his position with the Bruins to return to farming. Two years later he returned to football for a brief time as general manager of the Sylvan Park Dead Cherokees, a semi-pro team in Tennessee.

Wrestling

During his football career, he built a second athletic career as a professional wrestler and became a major box-office attraction. Tony Stecher, brother of former world champion Joe Stecher, introduced Nagurski to wrestling in 1933 and became his manager. Nagurski defeated Tag Tagerson in his ring debut. Hitting his peak in the late 1930s, Nagurski won a limited version of the world championship by defeating Dean Detton on June 29, 1937. But he finally achieved full recognition with his first National Wrestling Association world title by defeating Lou Thesz on June 23, 1939. Losing the title to Ray Steele on March 7, 1940, he regained it from Steele one year later on March 11, 1941, but lost it three months later to Sandor Szabo on June 5, 1941. Nagurski continued to wrestle until 1960.

Championships and accomplishments
 California State Athletic Commission
 World Heavyweight Championship (Los Angeles version) (1 time)
George Tragos/Lou Thesz Professional Wrestling Hall of Fame
 Class of 2009
National Wrestling Association
NWA/NBA World Heavyweight Championship (2 times)
 New York State Athletic Commission
New York State Athletic Commission World Heavyweight Championship (1 time)
Minneapolis Wrestling and Boxing Club
World Heavyweight Championship (Minneapolis version) (2 times)
NWA World Tag Team Championship (Minneapolis version) (1 time) – with Verne Gagne
NWA San Francisco
NWA Pacific Coast Heavyweight Championship (San Francisco version) (2 times)
Professional Wrestling Hall of Fame and Museum
(Class of 2011)
Wrestling Observer Newsletter awards
Wrestling Observer Newsletter Hall of Fame (Class of 1996)
Other titles
World Heavyweight Championship (original version) (1 time)

Personal life
Nagurski married his childhood sweetheart, Eileen Kane, on December 28, 1936. The couple had six children: sons Bronko Jr., Tony, Ronald and Kevin, and daughters Genie and Janice. Bronko Jr. was born on Christmas Day 1937, played football at the University of Notre Dame, and became an all-star with the Hamilton Tiger-Cats of the Canadian Football League.

Later life and legacy

Later life
After Nagurski's retirement from wrestling, he returned home to International Falls and opened a service station. A local legend claims that Nagurski had the best repeat business in town because he would screw customers' gas caps on so tightly after filling their tanks that no one else in town could unscrew them. He retired from that in 1978, at the age of seventy, and lived out a quiet life on the shores of Rainy Lake on the Canada–U.S. border.

In January 1984, Nagurski performed the coin toss at Super Bowl XVIII in Tampa, Florida, with Washington Redskins quarterback and co-captain Joe Theismann calling the toss on behalf of his team's co-captains and the captains of the opposing Los Angeles Raiders.

On January 7, 1990, Nagurski died of cardiac arrest in International Falls, Minnesota, and is buried at its Forest Hill Cemetery.

Legacy
Nagurski was elected to the Pro Football Hall of Fame as a charter member on September 7, 1963. At the University of Minnesota house of his fraternity, Sigma Chi, Nagurski's jersey and Significant Sig recognition certificate are on display. After his death, the town of International Falls honored him by opening the Bronko Nagurski Museum in Smokey Bear Park.

Sports Illustrated named Nagurski one of the four greatest athletes in Minnesota state history; the other three were Dave Winfield, Kevin McHale, and Joe Mauer. In 1993, the Football Writers Association of America created the Bronko Nagurski Trophy, awarded annually to the best defensive player in college football. Notable winners include Warren Sapp, Charles Woodson, Terrell Suggs, Champ Bailey and Derrick Johnson. In 1999 Nagurski was selected by Sports Illustrated as a starting defensive tackle for their "NCAA Football All-Century Team". The other starting defensive tackle on that list was Rich Glover. In 2007, Nagurski was ranked No. 17 on ESPN's Top 25 Players In College Football History list.

In 1999, he was ranked No. 35 on The Sporting News''' list of the 100 Greatest Football Players, the highest-ranking foreign-born player. In 2000, he was voted the second-greatest Minnesotan sportsman of the 20th century by the sportswriters of the Star Tribune, coming in behind only Minnesota Twins Hall of Famer Kirby Puckett.

A fictionalized eyewitness account of Nagurski's 1943 comeback is the subject of a dramatic monologue in the 2001 film version of Hearts in Atlantis. The film's screenwriter, William Goldman, repeated much of this rendition from his earlier account of the same story in his novel Magic.''

In 2009, Nagurski was an honorary team captain, represented by his son, Bronko Nagurski Jr., at the opening game of TCF Bank Stadium. His home town International Falls high school nickname is the Broncos in his honor.

In September 2021, he was an inductee into the National Polish-American Hall of Fame, housed in Troy, Michigan.

See also
List of Canadian sports personalities

Notes

References

Further reading

External links

 
 
 
 
 

1908 births
1990 deaths
All-American college football players
American football fullbacks
American football tackles
American male professional wrestlers
American people of Ukrainian descent
Canadian emigrants to the United States
Canadian people of Ukrainian descent
Canadian players of American football
Canadian male professional wrestlers
Chicago Bears players
College Football Hall of Fame inductees
Minnesota Golden Gophers football players
National Football League players with retired numbers
People from International Falls, Minnesota
People from Rainy River District
Players of American football from Minnesota
Pro Football Hall of Fame inductees
Professional wrestlers from Minnesota
Professional wrestlers from Ontario
Professional Wrestling Hall of Fame and Museum
UCLA Bruins football coaches
20th-century American male actors
Stampede Wrestling alumni
20th-century professional wrestlers